Brachinus olgae is a species of ground beetle in the Brachinoaptinus subgenus that is endemic to Spain.

References

Beetles described in 1993
Endemic fauna of Spain
Beetles of Europe
Brachininae